Maguda is a genus of moths of the family Erebidae found among the coast of East Asia and Northern Australia. The genus was erected by Francis Walker in 1866.

Species
Maguda immundalis Walker, [1866] Borneo
Maguda multifasciata (Swinhoe, 1890) Myanmar
Maguda palpalis (Walker, [1866])
Maguda pilipes Hampson, 1926 Sri Lanka
Maguda suffusa (Walker, 1863) Borneo
Maguda wollastoni (Rothschild, 1915) New Guinea

References

Calpinae
Moth genera